Sir John Campbell Longstaff (10 March 1861 – 1 October 1941) was an Australian painter, war artist and a five-time winner of the Archibald Prize for portraiture. His cousin Will Longstaff was also a painter and war artist.

Longstaff was known for being fashionable and for being one of the most prolific portrait painters of the early 20th century.

Biography
Longstaff was born at Clunes, Victoria, second son of Ralph Longstaff, storekeeper and Janet (Jessie) Campbell. John was educated at a boarding school in Miners Rest and Clunes State School. He later studied at the Melbourne National Gallery School, after his father initially disapproved of his artistic ambitions. Longstaff's talent was recognised by George Folingsby. He married Rosa Louisa (Topsy) Crocker on 20 July 1887 Powlett Street, East Melbourne.

He won the National Gallery of Victoria's first travelling scholarship for his 1887 narrative painting Breaking the News (which inspired a 1912 film of the same name), and John and his wife sailed from Melbourne for London in September 1887. In January 1888 they travelled to Paris, where John exhibited in the Paris Salon. He later moved to London, where he painted many portraits. He returned to Australia in 1894 and was given several commissions. He occupied a studio at Grosvenor Chambers in Melbourne from 1897 to 1900. The National Gallery of Victoria assumed ownership of The Sirens under terms of the scholarship and bought his large landscape Gippsland, Sunday night, 20 February 1898. He travelled to London again in 1901, where he exhibited with the Royal Academy.

Longstaff was appointed an official war artist with the Australian Infantry Force in the First World War. He made several portraits of officers in the military. On his return to Australia he won several awards and was given distinguished positions, such as his appointment to President of the Victorian Artists Society in 1924 and Trustee of the National Gallery of Victoria in 1927. He was knighted in the 1928 New Year Honours List, the first Australian artist to have had this honour.

In 1924, Longstaff met Miss Jessica Harcourt, at the time a theatre programme seller, and later actress, in Sydney and later called "Australia's loveliest girl". He was struck by her beauty and painted her twice. In 1925 he exhibited Harcourt's portrait with Twenty Melbourne Painters at the Athenaeum Hall. Longstaff was happy with his subject, regarding Harcourt as "almost a perfect type of feminine beauty", and it was considered "one of the best things he had ever done."

His 1929 portrait of the artist Ellis Rowan was the first national portrait of an Australian woman.

The Art Gallery of South Australia holds his portraits of Paris Nesbit and The Artist's Wife.

Longstaff's portraits of women were the subject of the 2012 exhibition Portrait of a Lady at the Shepparton Art Museum.

Biography
His biography Portrait in Youth, written by Nina Murdoch was published in 1948. His 1920 portrait of Nina Murdoch hangs in Reading Room of the National Library, Canberra.

Archibald prize
His Archibald Prize winning pieces:

1925 - Portrait of Maurice Moscovitch
1928 - Portrait of Dr Alexander Leeper
1929 - W A Holman, KC
1931 - Sir John Sulman
1935 - A B ('Banjo') Paterson

Gallery

References
Leigh Astbury, 'Longstaff, Sir John Campbell (1861–1941)', Australian Dictionary of Biography, Volume 10, MUP, 1986, pp 141–142.

External links

John Longstaff at Artcyclopedia
LONGSTAFF, Sir John at the Australian War Memorial 
Portrait of Jessica Harcourt, 1925, National Gallery of Victoria
Catalogue for Portrait of a Lady exhibition, 2012, Shepparton Art Museum 

1861 births
1941 deaths
Knights Bachelor
Australian war artists
Australian portrait painters
Archibald Prize winners
Archibald Prize finalists
People from Clunes, Victoria
World War I artists
19th-century Australian painters
19th-century Australian male artists
20th-century Australian painters
20th-century Australian male artists
Australian male painters
National Gallery of Victoria Art School alumni